The Asian Tigers is an Afghan militant group, first publicised when they claimed credit for the kidnapping of former Pakistani intelligence officers Khalid Khawaja and Colonel Imam and British journalist Asad Qureshi and his driver - Rustam Khan - in March 2010. Khawaja was killed in April 2010. Qureshi and Khan were released in September 2010 after 165 days in captivity. Imam was killed in January 2011.

The group is variously described as a breakoff of Lashkar-e Jhangvi or a front group for the Harkat-ul-Jihad-al-Islami. It is also affliliated with Jaish-e-Mohammad, Lashkar-e-Taiba, and Tehrik-i-Taliban Pakistan.

References

Jihadist groups in Pakistan
Terrorism in Pakistan